George Thomas Holland II (born July 23, 1961) is a Democratic member of the Kansas Senate, representing the 3rd district since 2009. He was a member of the Kansas House of Representatives from 2003 to 2008.

He is the ranking minority member on both the Senate Assessment and Taxation & Commerce committees and serves on the Joint Committee on Information Technology.

2010 gubernatorial race 

He announced on February 17, 2010, that he would seek the 2010 Democratic nomination to be the next Kansas Governor. Holland was defeated by Sam Brownback in the general election.

Major donors 
The top contributors to Holland's 2008 Kansas Senate campaign:
Kansas Democratic Party, Tom and Barbara Holland (personal campaign contributions), Senate Democratic Committee of Kansas, Democratic Senatorial Campaign Committee of Kansas, Carpenters Local 1329 union

His largest donor group was political party committees.

Professional career 
Holland is a small business owner and entrepreneur.  He is president of Holland Technologies, an informational technology services firm, and has run the business since 1994.  He is also the founder of a Kansas farm winery and vineyard operation called Haven Pointe Winery LLC located in Baldwin City.

Personal life 
Holland was born and raised in Indianapolis, Indiana.  He and his wife Barbara have four children - Thomas, Derek, Brandon and Louisa Holland.

References

External links
Senator Tom Holland official Kansas Legislature site
Tom Holland/Kelly Kultala  for Governor/Lt. Governor official campaign site
Holland Technologies

1961 births
21st-century American politicians
Democratic Party Kansas state senators
Living people
Indiana University Bloomington alumni
University of Minnesota alumni
Democratic Party members of the Kansas House of Representatives